Des Moines Township is a township in Polk County, Iowa, United States.

History
Des Moines Township was organized on 26 March 1860.

Its elevation is listed as 942 feet above mean sea level.

References

Townships in Polk County, Iowa
Townships in Iowa